The Whitewater controversy, Whitewater scandal, Whitewatergate, or simply Whitewater, was an American political controversy during the 1990s. It began with an investigation into the real estate investments of Bill and Hillary Clinton and their associates, Jim McDougal and Susan McDougal, in the Whitewater Development Corporation. This failed business venture was incorporated in 1979 with the purpose of developing vacation properties on land along the White River near Flippin, Arkansas.

A March 1992 New York Times article published during the 1992 U.S. presidential campaign reported that the Clintons, then governor and first lady of Arkansas, had invested and lost money in the Whitewater Development Corporation. The article stimulated the interest of L. Jean Lewis, a Resolution Trust Corporation investigator who was looking into the failure of Madison Guaranty Savings and Loan, also owned by Jim and Susan McDougal.

Lewis looked for connections between the savings and loan company and the Clintons, and on September 2, 1992, she submitted a criminal referral to the FBI naming Bill and Hillary Clinton as witnesses in the Madison Guaranty case. Little Rock U.S. Attorney Charles A. Banks and the FBI determined that the referral lacked merit, but Lewis continued to pursue the case. From 1992 to 1994, Lewis issued several additional referrals against the Clintons and repeatedly called the U.S. Attorney's Office in Little Rock and the Justice Department regarding the case. Her referrals eventually became public knowledge, and she testified before the Senate Whitewater Committee in 1995.

David Hale, the source of criminal allegations against the Clintons, claimed in November 1993 that Bill Clinton had pressured him into providing an illegal $300,000 loan to Susan McDougal, the Clintons' partner in the Whitewater land deal. The allegations were regarded as questionable because Hale had not mentioned Clinton in reference to this loan during the original FBI investigation of Madison Guaranty in 1989; only after coming under indictment himself in 1993, did Hale make allegations against the Clintons. A U.S. Securities and Exchange Commission investigation resulted in convictions against the McDougals for their role in the Whitewater project. Jim Guy Tucker, Bill Clinton's successor as governor, was convicted of fraud and sentenced to four years of probation for his role in the matter. Susan McDougal served 18 months in prison for contempt of court for refusing to answer questions relating to Whitewater.

Neither Bill Clinton nor Hillary Clinton were ever prosecuted, after three separate inquiries found insufficient evidence linking them with the criminal conduct of others related to the land deal. The matter was handled by the Whitewater Independent Counsel, Republican Kenneth Starr. The last of these inquiries came from the final Independent Counsel, Robert Ray (who replaced Starr) in 2000.  Susan McDougal was granted a pardon by President Clinton before he left office.

Nomenclature 
The term "Whitewater" is sometimes used to include other controversies from the Bill Clinton administration, especially Travelgate, Filegate, and the circumstances surrounding Vince Foster's death, that were also investigated by the Whitewater Independent Counsel.

But Whitewater proper refers only to the matters stemming from the Whitewater Development Corporation and subsequent developments.

History

Origins of Whitewater Development Corporation

Bill Clinton had known Arkansas businessman and political figure Jim McDougal since 1968, and had made a previous real estate investment with him in 1977. In spring of 1978, McDougal proposed that the Clintons join him and his wife, Susan, in buying  of undeveloped land along the south bank of the White River near Flippin, Arkansas, in the Ozark Mountains. The goal was to subdivide the site into lots for vacation homes, intended for the many people coming south from Chicago and Detroit who were interested in low property taxes, fishing, rafting, and mountain scenery. The plan was to hold the property for a few years and then sell the lots at a profit.

The four borrowed $203,000 to buy land, and subsequently transferred ownership of the land to the newly created Whitewater Development Corporation, in which all four participants had equal shares. Susan McDougal chose the name "Whitewater Estates" and their sales pitch was, "One weekend here and you'll never want to live anywhere else." The business was incorporated on June 18, 1979.

Failure of Whitewater Development Corporation and Castle Grande
By the time the Whitewater lots were surveyed and available for sale at the end of 1979, interest rates had climbed to near 20%. Prospective buyers could no longer afford to buy vacation homes. Rather than take a loss on the venture, the four decided to build a model home and wait for better economic conditions.

Following the land purchase, Jim McDougal asked the Clintons for additional funds for interest payments on the loan and other expenses; the Clintons later claimed to have no knowledge of how these contributions were used. When Bill Clinton failed to win re-election in 1980, Jim McDougal lost his job as the governor's economic aide and decided to go into banking. He acquired the Bank of Kingston in 1980 and the Woodruff Savings & Loan in 1982, renaming them the Madison Bank & Trust and the Madison Guaranty Savings & Loan, respectively.

In spring 1985, McDougal held a fundraiser at Madison Guaranty's office in Little Rock that paid off Clinton's 1984 gubernatorial campaign debt of $50,000. McDougal raised $35,000; $12,000 of that was in Madison Guaranty cashier's checks.

In 1985, Jim McDougal invested in a local construction project called Castle Grande. The 1,000 acres (400 ha), located south of Little Rock, were priced at about $1.75 million, more than McDougal could afford on his own. According to then current law, McDougal could borrow only $600,000 from his own savings and loan, Madison Guaranty. Therefore, McDougal involved others to raise the additional funds. Among these was Seth Ward, a Madison official, who helped funnel the additional $1.15 million required. To avoid potential investigations, the money was moved back and forth among several other investors and intermediaries. Hillary Clinton, then an attorney at Rose Law Firm (which is based in Little Rock) provided legal services to Castle Grande.

In 1986, federal regulators realized that all of the necessary funds for this real estate venture had come from Madison Guaranty; regulators called Castle Grande a sham. In July of that year, McDougal resigned from Madison Guaranty. Seth Ward fell under investigation, along with the lawyer who helped him draft the agreement.
Castle Grande earned $2 million in commissions and fees for McDougal's business associates, as well as an unknown amount in legal fees for Rose Law Firm, but in 1989, it collapsed, at a cost to the government of $4 million. This in turn helped trigger the 1989 collapse of Madison Guaranty, which federal regulators then had to take over. Taking place in the midst of the nationwide savings and loan crisis, the failure of Madison Guaranty cost the United States $73 million.

The Clintons lost between $37,000 and $69,000 on their Whitewater investment; this was less than the McDougals lost. The reasons for the unequal capital contributions by the Clintons and McDougals are unknown but the President's critics cited the discrepancy as evidence that then-Governor Clinton was to contribute to the project in other ways.

The White House and the President's supporters claimed that they were exonerated by the Pillsbury Report. This was a $3 million study done for the Resolution Trust Corporation by the Pillsbury, Madison & Sutro law firm at the time that Madison Guaranty Savings & Loan was dissolved. The report concluded that James McDougal, who had set up the deal, was the managing partner, and Bill Clinton was a passive investor in the venture; the Associated Press characterized it as "generally support[ing] the Clintons' description of their involvement in Whitewater".  However, Charles Patterson, the attorney who supervised the report, "refused ... to call it a vindication" of the Clintons, stating in testimony before the Senate Whitewater Committee that "it was not our purpose to vindicate, castigate, exculpate."

Bill Clinton's run for president
During Bill Clinton's 1992 presidential run, he was asked by New York Times reporters about the failure of the Whitewater development. The subsequent New York Times article, by reporter Jeff Gerth, appeared on March 8, 1992.

Removal of documents
Within hours of the death of Deputy White House Counsel Vince Foster in July 1993, chief White House counsel Bernard Nussbaum removed documents, some of them concerning the Whitewater Development Corporation, from Foster's office and gave them to Maggie Williams, Chief of Staff to the First Lady. According to The New York Times, Williams placed the documents in a safe in the Clinton residence on the third floor of the  White House for five days before turning them over to the Clinton family lawyer.

Interference by White House officials 
White House counsel Bernard Nussbaum obstructed both the justice department investigation and parks department's investigation into Vince Foster by refusing to hand over documents found in Foster briefcase.

On February 25, 1994, George Stephanopoulos and Harold M. Ickes attempted to obstruct the Madison Guaranty investigation. Stephanopoulos and Ickes had a conference call with Roger Altman in which they protested the hiring of Jay Stephens, who was heading the investigation. On the call Stephanopoulos asked if Stephens could be removed.

In April 1994 after Webster Hubbell resigned from his position as Associate Attorney General and was facing fraud charges, there was the potential that he might cooperate with Ken Starr's investigation. During the time there was pressure for Hubbell to cooperate, Clinton's chief of staff Mack McLarty, Clinton aide Bruce Lindsey, and Clinton friend Vernon Jordan arranged for Hubbell to be paid from consulting contracts. They did so with the approval of the first lady and President Clinton. In the Starr Report, Starr said "the jobs and money paid to Mr. Hubbell by friends and contributors to the President had raised serious questions about whether such assistance was designed to influence Mr. Hubbell’s testimony about Madison-related matters".

Subpoena of the president and his wife

As a result of the exposé in The New York Times, the Justice Department opened an investigation into the failed Whitewater deal. Media pressure continued to build, and on April 22, 1994, Hillary Clinton gave an unusual press conference under a portrait of Abraham Lincoln in the State Dining Room of the White House, to address questions on both Whitewater and the cattle futures controversy; it was broadcast live on several networks. In it, she claimed that the Clintons had a passive role in the Whitewater venture and had committed no wrongdoing, but admitted that her explanations had been vague. She said that she no longer opposed appointing a special prosecutor to investigate the matter. Afterwards, she won media praise for the manner in which she conducted herself during the press conference; Time called her "open, candid, but above all unflappable...the real message was her attitude and her poise. The confiding tone and relaxed body language...immediately drew approving reviews". By that time there was growing backlash from Democrats and other members of the political left against the press' investigations of Whitewater. The New York Times was criticized by Gene Lyons of Harper's Magazine, who felt its reporters were exaggerating the significance and possible impropriety of what they were uncovering.

At Clinton's request, Attorney General Janet Reno appointed a special prosecutor, Robert B. Fiske, to investigate the legality of the Whitewater transactions in 1994. Two allegations surfaced: 1) that Clinton had exerted pressure on an Arkansas businessman, David Hale, to make a loan that would benefit himself and the owners of Madison Guaranty; 2) that an Arkansas bank had concealed transactions involving Clinton's gubernatorial campaign in 1990. In May 1994, Fiske issued a grand jury subpoena to the President and his wife for all documents relating to Madison Guaranty, with a deadline of 30 days. They were reported as missing by the Clintons. Almost two years later, the subpoenaed billing records of the Rose Law Firm were discovered in the Clintons' private residence in the White House, with fingerprints of Hillary Clinton, among others.

The Kenneth Starr investigation
In August 1994, Republican Kenneth Starr was appointed by a three-judge panel to continue the Whitewater investigation, replacing Republican Robert B. Fiske, who had been specially appointed by US attorney general Janet Reno, prior to the re-enactment of the Independent Counsel law. Fiske was replaced because he had been chosen and appointed by Janet Reno, Clinton's attorney general, creating the appearance of a conflict of interest.

David Hale
The key witness against President Clinton in Starr's Whitewater investigation, was banker David Hale who alleged in November 1992 that Clinton, while governor of Arkansas, pressured him to provide an illegal $300,000 loan to Susan McDougal, the partner of the Clintons in the Whitewater deal.

Attorney Randy Coleman's defense strategy was to present Hale as the victim of high-powered politicians who forced him to give away all of the money. This characterization was undermined by testimony from November 1989, wherein FBI agents investigating the failure of Madison Guaranty had questioned Hale about his dealings with Jim and Susan McDougal, including the $300,000 loan. According to the agents' official memorandum of that interview, Hale described in some detail his dealings with Jim Guy Tucker (then an attorney in private practice, later Bill Clinton's lieutenant governor), both McDougals, and several others, but never mentioned Governor Bill Clinton.

Clinton denied that he pressured Hale to approve the loan to Susan McDougal. By this time, Hale had already pleaded guilty to two felonies and secured a reduction in his sentence in exchange for his testimony against Bill Clinton. Charges were made by Clinton supporters that Hale had received numerous cash payments from representatives of the so-called Arkansas Project, a $2.4 million campaign established to assist in Hale's defense strategy, and to investigate Clinton and his associates between 1993 and 1997.

These charges were the topic of a separate investigation by former Department of Justice investigator, Michael E. Shaheen Jr. Shaheen filed his report in July 1999 to Starr, who stated that the allegations that Hale had been paid in hopes of influencing his testimony were "unsubstantiated or, in some cases, untrue". No further charges were brought against Hale or the Arkansas Project outlet, The American Spectator, though Hale later pled guilty in the Whitewater case to two felonies and served 21 months of a 28-month sentence.
Writers from Salon have complained that the full, 168-page report had not been made public, a complaint still being reiterated by Salon as of 2001.

State prosecutors issued an arrest warrant for Hale in early July 1996, charging that Hale had misrepresented the solvency of his insurance company, National Savings Life, to the state insurance commission. The prosecutors also alleged in court papers that Hale had made those misrepresentations to conceal the fact that he had looted the insurance company. Hale said that any infraction was a technicality and that no one had lost any money. In March 1999, Hale was convicted of the first charge, with the jury recommending a 21-day jail sentence.

Starr drafted an impeachment referral to the House of Representatives in the fall of 1997, alleging that there was "substantial and credible evidence" that Bill Clinton had committed perjury regarding Hale's allegations. Hale pleaded guilty in the Whitewater case to two felonies and served 21 months of a 28-month sentence.

Webster Hubbell
Theodore B. Olson, who with several associates, launched the plan that later became known as the "Arkansas Project", wrote several essays for The American Spectator, accusing Clinton and many of his associates of wrongdoing. The first of those pieces appeared in February 1994, alleging a wide variety of criminal offenses by the Clintons and others, including Webster Hubbell. These allegations led to the discovery that Hubbell, a friend and former Rose Law Firm partner of Hillary Clinton, had committed multiple frauds, mostly against his own firm. Hillary Clinton, instead of being complicit in Hubbell's crimes, had been among his victims. In December 1994, one week after Hubbell pleaded guilty to mail fraud and tax evasion, Associate White House Counsel, Jane C. Sherburne, created a "Task List" which included a reference to monitoring Hubbell's cooperation with Starr. Hubbell was later recorded in prison saying "I need to roll over one more time" regarding the Rose Law firm lawsuit. In his next court appearance, he pleaded the Fifth Amendment against self-incrimination (see United States v. Hubbell).

In February 1997, Starr announced he would leave the investigation to pursue a position at the Pepperdine University School of Law. However, he "flip flopped" in the face of "intense criticism" by conservatives and new evidence of sexual misconduct, diverted to some degree by the burgeoning Clinton–Lewinsky scandal. Starr's investigations in Arkansas were winding down, with his Little Rock grand jury about to expire.

Susan McDougal
Hubbell, Jim Guy Tucker, and Susan McDougal had all refused to cooperate with Starr. Tucker and McDougal were later pardoned by President Clinton. When the Arkansas grand jury did conclude its work in May 1998, after 30 months in panel, it came up with only a contempt indictment against Susan McDougal. Although she refused to testify under oath regarding the Clintons' involvement in Whitewater, Susan McDougal did make the case in the media that the Clintons had been truthful in their account of the loan, and had cast doubt on her former husband's motives for cooperating with Starr. She also claimed that James McDougal felt abandoned by Clinton, and told her "he was going to pay back the Clintons". She said to the press, again not under oath, that her husband had told her that Republican activist and Little Rock lawyer, Sheffield Nelson, was willing to "pay him some money" for talking to The New York Times about Bill Clinton, and in 1992, he told her that one of Clinton's political enemies was paying him to tell The New York Times about Whitewater.

From the beginning, Susan McDougal charged that Starr had offered her "global immunity" from other charges if she would cooperate with the Whitewater investigation. McDougal told the jury that refusing to answer questions about the Clintons and Whitewater wasn't easy for her, or her family. "It's been a long road, a very long road...and it was not an easy decision to make", McDougal told the court. McDougal refused to answer any questions while under oath, leading to her being imprisoned by the judge for civil contempt of court for the maximum 18 months, including eight months in isolation. Starr's subsequent indictment of McDougal for criminal contempt of court charges resulted in a jury hung 7–5, in favor of acquittal. President Clinton later pardoned her, shortly before leaving office (see list of people pardoned by Bill Clinton).

Starr Whitewater Report
In September 1998, Independent Counsel Starr released the Starr Report, concerning offenses alleged to have been committed by President Clinton, as part of the Lewinsky scandal. The report mentioned Whitewater only in passing; Clinton friend and advisor, Vernon Jordan, Clinton aide Bruce Lindsey, and Clinton chief of staff Mack McLarty had helped Webster Hubbell financially by getting him "no-show" consulting contracts while he was under pressure to cooperate with the Whitewater investigations. Indeed, it was on this basis that Starr took on the Lewinsky investigation, under the umbrella of the Whitewater Independent Counsel mandate.

There was much acrimony from the most fervent critics of the Clintons, after the release of the Starr report on the Foster matter and after Starr's departure and return to the case. The death of Foster had been the source of many conspiracy theories. Christopher Ruddy, a reporter for Richard Mellon Scaife's Pittsburgh Tribune-Review, and later CEO of Newsmax, helped fuel much of this speculation with claims that Starr had not pursued this line of inquiry far enough.

Criminal referrals 
Starr received several criminal referrals from congress but declined to prosecute. Susan Thomases and Webster Hubbell were alleged to have lied to congress, and Harold M. Ickes was accused of misleading congress.

Reaction of the Clintons
On January 26, 1996, Hillary Clinton testified before a grand jury concerning her investments in Whitewater. This was the first time in American history that a first lady had been subpoenaed to testify before a grand jury. She testified that they never borrowed any money from the bank, and denied having caused anyone to borrow money on their behalf.

Reaction of Congress
Parallel to the Independent Counsel track, both houses of the United States Congress had been investigating Whitewater and holding hearings on it. The House Committee on Financial Services had been scheduled to begin hearings in late March 1994, but they were postponed after an unusually angry, written communication from Democratic Banking Committee chair Henry B. Gonzalez to Republican Jim Leach. Gonzalez called Leach "obstinate", "obdurate", "in willful disregard" of House etiquette, and "premeditatedly" plotting a "judicial adventure". The House Banking Committee began its hearings in late July 1994.

The Senate Banking, Housing, and Urban Affairs Committee also began hearings on Whitewater in July 1994. These hearings intensified in May 1995, following the Republican gain of control, when the Republican Banking Committee chairman Al D'Amato also became chair of the newly formed Special Whitewater Committee. The Whitewater committee's hearings were much more extensive than those held previously by the Democrats, running for 300 hours over 60 sessions across 13 months, and taking over 10,000 pages of testimony and 35,000 pages of depositions from almost 250 people. The hearings' testimony and senatorial lines of investigation mostly followed partisan lines, with Republicans investigating the President and the Democrats defending him. The Senate Special Whitewater Committee issued an 800-page majority report on June 18, 1996, which only hinted at one possible improper action by President Clinton, but spoke of the Clinton Administration as "an American presidency [that] misused its power, circumvented the limits on its authority and attempted to manipulate the truth". The first lady came in for much stronger criticism, as she was "the central figure" in all aspects of the alleged wrongdoings. The Democratic minority on the Committee called these findings "a legislative travesty", "a witch hunt", and "a political game".

On November 19, 1998, Independent Counsel Starr testified before the House Judiciary Committee in connection with the Impeachment of Bill Clinton over charges related to the Clinton–Lewinsky scandal. Starr said that in late 1997, he had considered preparing an impeachment report regarding the fraudulent $300,000 loan to Susan McDougall and the question of whether the President had testified truthfully regarding the loan. Starr said that he held back the charges because he was not sure that the two major witnesses had told the truth, but that the investigation was still ongoing.

Regarding the reappearance of Hillary Clinton's Rose Law Firm billing records in the White House residential section, Starr said the investigation had found no explanation for the disappearance or the reappearance. "After a thorough investigation, we have found no explanation how the billing records got where they were or why they were not discovered and produced earlier. It remains a mystery to this day." Starr also chose this occasion to completely exonerate President Clinton of any wrongdoing in the Travelgate and Filegate matters; Democrats on the committee immediately criticized Starr for withholding these findings, as well as the Whitewater one, until after the 1998 Congressional elections.

Convictions
The Clintons were never charged with any crime.  Fifteen other people were convicted of more than 40 crimes, including Jim Guy Tucker, who resigned from office.
 Jim Guy Tucker: Governor of Arkansas at the time, resigned (fraud, 3 counts)
 John Haley: attorney for Jim Guy Tucker (tax evasion)
 William J. Marks Sr.: Jim Guy Tucker's business partner (conspiracy)
 Stephen Smith: former Governor Clinton aide (conspiracy to misapply funds). Bill Clinton pardoned.
 Webster Hubbell: Clinton political supporter; U.S. Associate Attorney General; Rose Law Firm partner (embezzlement, fraud)
 Jim McDougal: banker, Clinton political supporter: (18 felonies, varied)
 Susan McDougal: Clinton political supporter (multiple frauds). Bill Clinton pardoned.
 David Hale: banker, self-proclaimed Clinton political supporter: (conspiracy, fraud)
 Neal Ainley: Perry County Bank president (embezzled bank funds for Clinton campaign)
 Chris Wade: Whitewater real estate broker (multiple loan fraud). Bill Clinton pardoned.
 Larry Kuca: Madison real estate agent (multiple loan fraud)
 Robert W. Palmer: Madison appraiser (conspiracy). Bill Clinton pardoned.
 John Latham: Madison Bank CEO (bank fraud)
 Eugene Fitzhugh: Whitewater defendant (multiple bribery)
 Charles Matthews: Whitewater defendant (bribery)

Tax returns
In March 1992, during his presidential campaign, the Clintons acknowledged that on their 1984 and 1985 tax returns, they had claimed improper tax deductions for interest payments made by the Whitewater Development Company. Due to the age of the mistake, the Clintons were not obligated to make good the error, but Bill Clinton announced that they would nonetheless do so.

Deputy White House counsel Vince Foster looked into this matter, but did not take any action before his death. On December 28, 1993, almost two years after the original announcement, the Clintons did make a reimbursement payment, for $4,900, to the Internal Revenue Service. This was done just before Justice Department investigators started seeking the Clintons' Whitewater files. The payment was made without filing an amended return (possibly because the three-year period for amended return filing had passed), but did include full interest on the amount of the error, including the additional two-year delay. The Whitewater files in question, publicly released in August 1995, cast some doubt on the Clintons' assertions in the matter, as they showed that the couple was aware that the interest payments in question were paid by the Whitewater corporation, and not them personally.

Ray report
Kenneth Starr's successor as Independent Counsel, Robert Ray, released a report in September 2000, that stated "This office determined that the evidence was insufficient to prove to a jury beyond a reasonable doubt that either President or Mrs. Clinton knowingly participated in any criminal conduct." Nevertheless, Ray criticized the White House saying that delays in the production of evidence and "unmeritorious litigation" by the president's lawyers severely impeded the investigation's progress, leading to a total cost of nearly $60 million. Ray's report effectively closed the Whitewater investigation.

Aftermath
Bill and Hillary Clinton never visited the actual Whitewater property. In May 1985, Jim McDougal sold the remaining lots of the failed Whitewater Development Corporation to local realtor, Chris Wade. By 1993, there were a few occupied houses on the site, but most of the properties were still for sale. One owner, tired of the many reporters who visited the site, hung a sign saying "Go Home, Idiots". By 2007, there were about 12 houses in the subdivision, with the last lot up for sale by son, Chris Wade Jr., for $25,000. In Flippin, Arkansas, Jim McDougal's savings and loan bank had been replaced by a variety of small businesses, most recently a barbershop.

The length, expense, and results of the Whitewater investigations turned the public against the Office of the Independent Counsel; even Kenneth Starr was opposed to it. The Independent Counsel law was allowed to expire in 1999.

See also

 Clinton–Lewinsky scandal
 The Hunting of the President

References

External links
 Washington Post time line
 Washington Post key stories
 Washington Post players June 2, 1996; Page A01
 FINAL REPORT of the Special Committee to Investigate Whitewater Development Corporation and Related Matters. United States Senate Special Whitewater Committee. U.S. Government Printing Office. (June 17, 1996).
 

 
1992 controversies in the United States
Clinton administration controversies
Political scandals in the United States
Political scandals in Arkansas
Bill Clinton